An allocation site is the method, in Object-oriented programming, in which a particular object is created. For  example, if a method creates a new object Test it is considered an allocation site for that object.

References

Object-oriented programming